

See also
List of unsaturated fatty acids
Carboxylic acid
List of carboxylic acids
Dicarboxylic acid

 
Saturated Fatty Acids
Alkanoic acids